A body slam is a professional wrestling throw.

Body slam may also refer to:

 "Body Slam" (song), a 1982 song by Bootsy Collins 
 Body Slam (film), a 1987 film
 Bodyslam (band), a Thai rock band
 Body Slam, a 1986 Sega arcade wrestling video game that was adapted into the Sega Master game Pro Wrestling
 Body Slam, an episode of the A-Team TV series, featuring Hulk Hogan